Ubalda García de Cañete (1807–1890) was the eldest daughter of the Paraguayan dictator José Gaspar Rodríguez de Francia.

Life
Ubalda's mother was María Juana García, a mistress of Francia. Although his daughter was illegitimate, and he was not known for any acts of kindness, Francia nonetheless respected his daughter. One day he found her prostituting herself near his residence, and rather than punishing her, he declared prostitution a decent profession (he himself used prostitutes). He also ordered that prostitutes had to wear golden combs in their hair, in the style of Spanish ladies.

At some point, Ubalda married Juan de la Cruz Cañete. She gave birth to a daughter, Francisca del Rosario, in 1842, two years after Francia's death. She died in 1890, aged 83.

References 

1807 births
1890 deaths
Children of national leaders
19th-century Paraguayan women